= Journal of Computer Virology and Hacking Techniques =

Scientific journal

- Discipline: Computer security
- Language: English
- Edited by: Eric Filiol

Publication details
- Former name: Journal in Computer Virology
- History: 2005—present
- Publisher: Springer Science+Business Media
- Frequency: Quarterly
- Impact factor: 1.9 (2024)

Standard abbreviations
- ISO 4: J. Comput. Virol. Hacking Tech.

Indexing
- ISSN: 2263-8733

Links
- Journal homepage; Online access; Online archive

Journal of Computer Virology and Hacking Techniques is a peer-reviewed scientific journal published quarterly by Springer Science+Business Media. It covers developments in computer security with an emphasis on malwares and hackings. The journal was previously known as Journal in Computer Virology from 2005 to 2013. Its current editor-in-chief is Eric Filiol (ENSIBS).

== Abstracting and indexing ==
The journal is abstracted and indexed in:

- Ei Compendex
- Inspec
- ProQuest databases
- Scopus

According to the Journal Citation Reports, the journal has a 2024 impact factor of 1.9.
